The Voice of Prophecy, founded in 1929 by H.M.S. Richards, Sr., is a Seventh-day Adventist religious radio ministry headquartered in Loveland, Colorado. Initially airing in 1929 on a single radio station in Los Angeles the Voice of Prophecy has since grown to numerous stations throughout the United States and Canada. It was one of the first religious programs in the United States to broadcast nationally. Under the leadership of Shawn and Jean Boonstra, the ministry has now expanded into additional forms of media, including the weekly Authentic broadcast  and Discovery Mountain radio adventure series for kids. Additional projects include humanitarian efforts in countries such as India  and Myanmar.

History
H.M.S. Richards, Sr. began a regular radio program on October 19, 1929 on KNX (AM) in Los Angeles.

Richards earliest studio was his South Gate Tabernacle near Long Beach, where he was presenting nightly evangelistic meetings. His office was a renovated chicken coop in Walnut Park, California. Seventh-day Adventist Church members donated their old eyeglasses and gave teeth with gold fillings and jewelry and watches to help buy the first radio time on Long Beach station KGER.

Later Richards presented daily live broadcasts of The Tabernacle of the Air over KGER in Long Beach, California, and live weekly remote broadcasts from his tabernacle to KMPC (AM) in Beverly Hills.

In January 1937 the broadcast footprint expanded over a network of several stations of the Don Lee Broadcasting System, and the name of the broadcast was changed to the Voice of Prophecy. The first Voice of Prophecy coast-to-coast broadcast was over 89 stations of the Mutual Broadcasting System on Sunday, January 4, 1942. It was one of the first religious programs to broadcast nationally.

Up until the early 1950s broadcasts were produced live. Mispronounced names and singer mistakes went out unedited to the listeners. By 1980, Richards had a $6 million budget. The Voice of Prophecy broadcast each Sunday to 700 stations around the world.

Throughout the years Voice of Prophecy broadcasts were marked by an opening theme song of "Lift Up the Trumpet" performed by the King's Heralds quartet and closed with Richard's poem "Have Faith in God" each week having a new verse written.

Speakers
H.M.S. Richards, Sr. was speaker from 1929 to 1969. In 1969, Richards' son, H.M.S. Richards, Jr., succeeded him and was speaker from 1969 to 1992. He was followed by Pastor Lonnie Melashenko, then by Fred Kinsey. The current speaker is Shawn Boonstra.

Musicians
Various musicians perform on the broadcast.
Female vocalist Del Delker began as a regular on the program since 1947. The male quartet King's Heralds also performed weekly on the program from 1936 until 1982.
Wayne Hooper served as musical director until his retirement in 1980.

Discover Bible School
A key program of Voice of Prophecy is the Discover Bible School.  Introduced on February 1, 1942 as The Bible School of the Air, it was one of the first correspondence Bible schools in North America.

Known today as the Discover Bible School it offers free Bible guides by mail 
or online
and has affiliate schools in over 120 countries with lessons in over 80 languages and dialects.

In 2010, the Bible School celebrated its one millionth graduate.

Evangelists 
Jim Reinking became a Voice of Prophecy evangelist in 1998 and served the ministry for 13 years.

See also

 28 fundamental beliefs
 Biblical Research Institute
 History of the Seventh-day Adventist Church
List of religions and religious denominations
List of Seventh-day Adventist hospitals
List of Seventh-day Adventist medical schools
List of Seventh-day Adventist secondary schools
List of Christian denominations
 Questions on Doctrine
 Seventh-day Adventist Church
 Seventh-day Adventist eschatology
 Seventh-day Adventist theology

References

External links
Voice of Prophecy website
Discovery Mountain website
Discover Bible School website
Bibleinfo website
KidsBibleinfo website

Independent ministries of the Seventh-day Adventist Church
Adventist organizations established in the 20th century
Christian eschatology
Christianity in the United States
Christian television networks
Television networks in the United States
Conservative media in the United States
Religious television stations in the United States
American Christian radio programs
Television series about Christianity